Jack Garrett (22 May 1914 – 11 September 1977) was an Irish Fianna Fáil politician, who was a member of Seanad Éireann from 1969 to 1981. A public works contractor, he was first elected to the Seanad in 1969 by the Administrative Panel. He was re-elected at the 1973 and 1977 elections. He died on 11 September 1977 before the 14th Seanad had first met. The by-election caused by his death was held on 7 December 1977 and was won by the Fianna Fáil candidate Michael Donnelly.

References

1914 births
1977 deaths
Fianna Fáil senators
Members of the 14th Seanad
Members of the 13th Seanad
Members of the 12th Seanad